William Evershed (25 November 1818 – 24 November 1887) was an English first-class cricketer who made his debut for Hampshire against Petworth in 1845. Evershed represented Hampshire against the same opposition again in the same season.

In 1849 Evershed made a single appearance for Sussex against Surrey.

Evershed died at Wisborough Green, Sussex on 24 November 1887.

External links
William Evershed at Cricinfo
William Evershed at CricketArchive

1818 births
1887 deaths
People from Wisborough Green
English cricketers
Hampshire cricketers
Sussex cricketers
Petworth cricketers